The International Review of Psychiatry is a bimonthly peer-reviewed medical journal published by Taylor & Francis on behalf of the Institute of Psychiatry (King's College London).  The editors-in-chief are Dinesh Bhugra (Institute of Psychiatry/Maudsley Hospital) and Margaret Chisolm (Johns Hopkins University). The journal was established in 1989.

Abstracting and indexing 
The journal is abstracted and indexed in:

According to the Journal Citation Reports, the journal has a 2016 impact factor of 2.240.

References

External links 

Publications established in 1989
Bimonthly journals
Taylor & Francis academic journals
Psychiatry journals
English-language journals